The 44th César Awards ceremony, presented by the Académie des Arts et Techniques du Cinéma, took place on 22 February 2019, at the Salle Pleyel in Paris to honour the best French films of 2018. Kristin Scott Thomas presided, and Kad Merad was the host. The ceremony was dedicated to Charles Aznavour, who died the previous October.

For the first time the "César des Lycéens" will be awarded, in a separate ceremony on 13 March 2019, at the Sorbonne in Paris. This award is to be conferred on one of the seven nominees for Best Film and is selected by the students of three high schools.

Winners and nominees
The nominees for the 44th César Awards were announced on January 23, 2019.

See also
 24th Lumières Awards
 9th Magritte Awards
 31st European Film Awards
 91st Academy Awards
 72nd British Academy Film Awards

References

External links
 Official website

2019 film awards
2019 in French cinema
2019 in Paris
2019
February 2019 events in France